Interstate 35W may refer to:
Interstate 35W (Texas), an  Interstate highway serving Fort Worth, Texas, and its suburbs
Interstate 35W (Minnesota), a  Interstate highway serving Minneapolis, Minnesota, and its suburbs
The I-35W Mississippi River bridge in Minneapolis, which collapsed on August 1, 2007
The I-35W Saint Anthony Falls Bridge, its replacement
Interstate 135 in Kansas, which was designated as Interstate 35W until 1976

See also 
Interstate 35E (disambiguation)

35W
W